The 2010 Russian Premier League was the 19th season of the Russian football championship since the dissolution of the Soviet Union and ninth under the current Russian Premier League name. The season started on 12 March 2010 and the last matches were played on 29 November 2010. On 14 November 2010, Zenit Saint Petersburg clinched the title after a 5–0 win against Rostov. This season was the last one played during an entire year (March–November), as the Russian Football Union decided to schedule the following seasons in sync with the biggest European football leagues (August–May).

Teams 
Kuban Krasnodar and Khimki were relegated at the end of the 2009 season after finishing in the bottom two places. Kuban make their immediate return to the First Division, while Khimki were relegated after a three-year tenure in the highest Russian football league.

The relegated teams were replaced by 2009 First Division champions Anzhi Makhachkala and runners-up Sibir Novosibirsk. Anzhi return after an eight-year hiatus from the Premier League, and Sibir will make their debut in the highest level of the Russian football pyramid.

On 5 February 2010, FC Moscow owner and main sponsor, MMC Norilsk Nickel, announced that the club will not play in the Premier League in 2010, possibly playing on a lower level instead. The club sent the official fax to the league refusing to participate in the 2010 competition on February 11, 2010. On 17 February, FC Moscow were officially excluded from the league and replaced by Alania Vladikavkaz, the third-placed team from the 2009 First Division. Alania thus make their return to the Premier League after a four-year absence.

Venues

Personnel and kits

Managerial changes

League table

Positions by round

Results

Statistics

Top goalscorers

Top assistants

Season events

Krylia Sovetov controversy 
Krylia Sovetov Samara, who were scheduled to pass licensing on February 4, asked Russian Football Union to postpone their licensing until February 15 due to financial problems and debts to players. The club was reported to be close to liquidation due to shortage of financing. It later asked to postpone the licensing again to February 19, but the RFU only postponed it until February 17. On February 17 it was decided to postpone the licensing until February 19 after all. Krylia Sovetov finally received their license on February 19 after agreeing on new contracts with several companies to sponsor them, some of which might become partial owners of the club.

As the first matchday arrived, Krylia Sovetov were still banned from registering new players because of debts outstanding on old contracts. They could only register 11 players over 21 years old and several more players from the youth team that were registered for them in 2009. The transfer deadline had to be extended from March 11 to April 8 to accommodate Krylia Sovetov in hope they will pay their outstanding debts shortly. With injuries on top of that and only 16 players available for both their main squad and the reserve team, their reserve team had to finish their first game with 9 players on the field as they only had a goalkeeper on the bench after two players were injured, and the main squad had to play against FC Zenit St. Petersburg with a heavily diluted roster, so even the loss with the score 0–1 was saluted by the Krylia's fans. The transfer ban was confirmed again on March 16, and was to remain in place until Krylia paid back their debts to their former players Jan Koller and Jiří Jarošík. Krylia lost the second game with the diluted roster 0–3 to FC Lokomotiv Moscow. The ban was finally lifted on March 26.

Awards 
On 9 December 2010 Russian Football Union named its list of 33 top players:

Goalkeepers
  Igor Akinfeev (CSKA)
  Sergei Ryzhikov (Rubin)
  Andriy Dykan (Terek / Spartak M.)

Right backs
  Aleksandr Anyukov (Zenit)
  Sergei Parshivlyuk (Spartak M.)
  Aleksei Berezutski (CSKA)

Right-centre backs
  Vasili Berezutski (CSKA)
  Bruno Alves (Zenit)
  César Navas (Rubin)

Left-centre backs
  Sergei Ignashevich (CSKA)
  Nicolas Lombaerts (Zenit)
  Leandro Fernández (Dynamo)

Left backs
  Tomáš Hubočan (Zenit)
  Georgi Schennikov (CSKA)
  Yevgeni Makeyev (Spartak M.)

Defensive midfielders
  Igor Denisov (Zenit)
  Roman Shirokov (Zenit)
  Pavel Mamayev (CSKA)

Right wingers
  Vladimir Bystrov (Zenit)
  Aiden McGeady (Spartak M.)
  David Tsorayev (Anzhi)

Central midfielders
  Konstantin Zyryanov (Zenit)
  Alex (Spartak M.)
  Keisuke Honda (CSKA)

Left wingers
  Danny (Zenit)
  Alan Kasaev (Rubin)
  Mark González (CSKA)

Right forwards
  Aleksandr Kerzhakov (Zenit)
  Kevin Kurányi (Dynamo)
  Seydou Doumbia (CSKA)

Left forwards
  Vágner Love (CSKA)
  Welliton (Spartak M.)
  Artem Dzyuba (Spartak M. / Tom)

Medal squads

See also 
 2010 Russian First Division
 2009–10 Russian Cup

References

External links 
 2010 Russian Premier League at Soccerway.com

2007
1
Russia
Russia

et:Premjer Liga